was the second and last vessel in the  of heavy cruisers in the Imperial Japanese Navy. The ship was named after the Chikuma River in Nagano Prefecture. Entering service in 1939, Chikuma saw battle during World War II in the Pacific. She was scuttled on 25 October 1944 after the Battle off Samar.

Background 
Chikuma was designed for long-range scouting missions and had a large seaplane capacity. She was extensively employed during World War II in conjunction with an aircraft carrier task force, or as part of a cruiser squadron with her sister ship, .

However, by the time construction began, serious weaknesses in the Mogami-class hull design had become clear following the Fourth Fleet Incident in 1935. As Japan no longer was obligated to abide by the limitations of the London Naval Treaty, a new design was created and new means of construction were utilized. Though the external dimensions were close to the Mogami class, the design was quite different, with four main battery turrets placed forward of the bridge, the second superfiring over the first, reserving the entire stern area as a large sea plane hangar. Unlike the United States Navy, the Japanese did not have a dual role attack/scout aircraft. No reconnaissance units were assigned to the Japanese carriers, and little emphasis was placed on this aspect of carrier warfare. Instead the Japanese reserved all of their carrier aircraft for attack roles. Reconnaissance was left up to float planes carried by cruisers. Chikuma was intended to provide the long range scout planes needed for their carrier Air Fleets.

Service career

Early career 

Chikuma was completed at Mitsubishi Nagasaki shipyards on 20 May 1939. After several months as a unit of the CruDiv6 (Sentai 6) of the Second Fleet, she was transferred to the CruDiv8 in November 1939. In addition to taking part in regular combat exercises in Japanese home waters, she operated off southern China on three occasions between March 1940 and March 1941.

Early stages of the Pacific War 
At the end of 1941, Chikuma was assigned to CruDiv 8 with its sister ship, Tone, and was thus one of the key players in the attack on Pearl Harbor. On 7 December 1941, Tone and Chikuma each launched one Aichi E13A1 Type 0 "Jake" floatplane for a final weather reconnaissance over Oahu. At 0630, Tone and Chikuma each launched short range Nakajima E4N2 Type 90-2 Reconnaissance Seaplane to act as pickets and patrol south of the Striking Force. Chikumas floatplane reported nine anchored American battleships (presumably counting  as a battleship).

On 16 December, CruDiv 8 was ordered to assist in the second attempted invasion of Wake Island. Anti-aircraft fire damaged the scout plane from Chikuma, which was forced to ditch, but the crew was rescued. After the fall of Wake Island, CruDiv 8 returned to Kure.

On 14 January 1942, CruDiv 8 was based out of Truk in the Caroline Islands, and covered the landings of Japanese troops at Rabaul, New Britain and attacks on Lae and Salamaua, New Guinea. On 24 January Chikumas floatplanes attacked the Admiralty Islands.

After the air raid on Kwajalein on 1 February by Vice Admiral William Halsey, Jr's aircraft carrier , Chikuma departed Truk with the Carrier Striking Force in an unsuccessful pursuit. Chikuma and Tone later participated in the Raid on Port Darwin, Australia on 19 February, sinking 11 ships. From 25 February 1942, Chikuma was involved in supporting the Japanese invasion of Java.

Battle of the Java Sea 
On 1 March 1942, Chikumas floatplane located the 8,806-ton Dutch freighter Modjokerto attempting to escape from Tjilatjap to Australia. Chikuma, with Tone, and destroyers  and  intercepted and sank the freighter before noon. Hits from Hiei, Tone and dive bombers from the aircraft carriers  and  finally stopped Edsall, which was then finished off by Chikuma.

On 4 March, Chikuma sank the 5,412-ton Dutch merchant Enggano (which had earlier been damaged by a floatplane from the cruiser ). On 5 March, floatplanes from Tone and Chikuma took part on the strike against Tjilatjap. After the surrender of the Dutch East Indies, Chikuma was assigned to Indian Ocean operations.

Indian Ocean raids 
On 5 April 1942, Chikuma was part of a major task force which launched 315 aircraft against British-held Colombo, Ceylon. After searching for more remnants of the Royal Navy, the Indian Ocean Task Force launched 91 Aichi D3A1 "Val" dive-bombers and 41 Mitsubishi A6M2 "Zeke" fighters on 9 April against the British naval base at Trincomalee, Ceylon. They found the harbor empty, but wrecked the base's facilities and shot down nine planes, and later sank the carrier , destroyer , and corvette , an oiler and a depot ship at sea  from base.

The task force with Chikuma returned to Japan in mid-April 1942, where it was almost immediately assigned to the unsuccessful pursuit of Admiral Halsey's Task Force 16.2 with the aircraft carrier  after the Doolittle Raid.

Battle of Midway 
At the crucial Battle of Midway, Chikuma and CruDiv 8 were in Vice Admiral Chuichi Nagumo's Carrier Striking Force. On 4 June, Tone and Chikuma each launched two Aichi E13A1 "Jake" long-range reconnaissance floatplanes to search out  for American carriers. The floatplane from Tone discovered American ships, but did not recognize that the fleet was a carrier group, which proved to be a crucial mistake. Chikumas floatplane found the aircraft carrier , and shadowed the ship for the next three hours, guiding the bombers that attacked Yorktown that evening. Two other floatplanes from Chikuma continued to observe the heavily damaged Yorktown through the night, during which time one plane and crew were lost. Chikuma then directed the submarine  to find and attack the Yorktown the following morning.

Chikuma and Tone were then detached to support Vice Admiral Boshiro Hosogaya's Aleutian invasion force. However, the anticipated American counter-attack failed to materialize. CruDiv 8 cruised northern waters uneventfully. Chikuma returned to Ominato port on 24 June.

Rear Admiral Chuichi Hara assumed command of CruDiv 8 from 14 July 1942.

Battle of the Eastern Solomons 
On 24 August 1942, CruDiv 7's  and  arrived to join the reinforcement fleet for Guadalcanal. The following morning, a PBY Catalina seaplane spotted Ryūjō, which SBDs and TBFs from Enterprise unsuccessfully attacked. Seven floatplanes from Tone and Chikuma were launched to locate the American fleet. One of Chikumas planes spotted the Americans, but was shot down before its report could be relayed. However, a second floatplane was more successful, and the Japanese launched an attack against Enterprise, hitting it with three bombs which set her wooden deck on fire. However, in the meantime, the Americans located the Japanese fleet, and Ryūjō was sunk by planes from the aircraft carrier . Chikuma was undamaged in this engagement, and returned to Truk safely.

Through October, Chikuma and Tone patrolled north of the Solomon Islands, waiting word of recapture of Henderson Field by the Japanese.

Battle of Santa Cruz 

They located the American fleet, and Abe followed with an attack which sank Hornet and damaged the battleship  and cruiser . However, Chikuma was attacked by a Douglas SBD Dauntless dive-bomber from Hornet, and quick thinking crewmen jettisoned her torpedoes seconds before a  bomb hit her starboard forward torpedo room. She was also hit by two other bombs, destroying one floatplane on the aircraft catapult. Chikuma suffered 190 killed and 154 wounded including Captain Komura.

Chikuma (escorted by the destroyers  and ) returned to Truk for emergency repairs, and was then sent back to Kure with the damaged carrier Zuihō. During refit and repairs, two additional twin Type 96 25-mm AA guns and a Type 21 air-search radar were added. Repairs were completed by 27 February 1943.

On 15 March 1943 Rear Admiral Kishi Fukuji assumed command of CruDiv 8, and Chikuma was ordered back to Truk. However, on 17 May, Chikuma and Tone were tasked to accompany the battleship  back to Tokyo for the state funeral of Admiral Isoroku Yamamoto. Chikuma was back in Truk by 15 July, having avoided numerous submarine attacks along the route.

From July to November, Chikuma was engaged in making troop transport runs to Rabaul, and to patrols of the Marshall Islands in unsuccessful pursuit of the American fleet. Chikuma, attacked by a single SBD, suffered only near-misses with minor damage.

Back at Kure on 12 December, Chikuma gained additional 25-mm AA guns, bringing its total to 20. CruDiv 8 was disbanded on 1 January 1944, and both Tone and Chikuma were reassigned to CruDiv 7 (with Suzuya and Kumano) under Rear Admiral Shoji Nishimura. Refit completed by 1 February, Chikuma returned to Singapore on 13 February and Batavia on 15 March after a month of raiding commerce in the Indian Ocean. On 20 March 1944, Rear Admiral Kazutaka Shiraishi assumed command of CruDiv 7, and Chikuma was made flagship.

Battle of the Philippine Sea 
On 13 June 1944, Admiral Soemu Toyoda activated "Operation A-GO" for the defense of the Mariana Islands. Chikuma was assigned to Force "C" Vice Admiral Jisaburo Ozawa's Mobile Fleet, which proceeded through the Visayan Sea to the Philippine Sea headed towards Saipan.

After ferrying army troops to Okinawa, Chikuma was reassigned back to Singapore in July, serving as flagship for CruDiv 4 while Atago was under repairs.

Battle of Leyte Gulf 

On 23 October 1944, Chikuma (with Kumano, Suzuya and Tone) sortied from Brunei towards the Philippines with Vice Admiral Takeo Kurita's First Mobile Striking Force. In the Battle of the Palawan Passage, Atago and Maya were sunk by submarines, and Takao damaged. In the Battle of the Sibuyan Sea the following day Musashi was sunk, the cruiser  was crippled and had to be towed to safety, while the battleships  and Haruna received damage.

On 25 October, during the Battle off Samar, Chikuma engaged U.S. escort aircraft carriers, helping to sink , but came under fire from the American destroyer  and heavy air attack. Chikuma inflicted severe damage on Heermann, but was soon attacked by four TBM Avenger torpedo-bombers. She was hit portside amidships by two torpedoes and her engine rooms flooded. Cady was later awarded the Navy Cross for his action.

The sole survivor from Chikuma was a crew member who was not picked up by Nowaki and drifted ashore on his own.

Chikuma was removed from the navy list on 20 April 1945.

References

Notes

Bibliography

External links
 
 Tabular record:   CombinedFleet.com: Chikuma history (Retrieved 26 January 2007.)
 Gallery: US Navy Historical Center

Tone-class cruisers
Ships built by Mitsubishi Heavy Industries
1938 ships
Second Sino-Japanese War cruisers of Japan
World War II cruisers of Japan
Cruisers sunk by aircraft
World War II shipwrecks in the Philippine Sea
Maritime incidents in October 1944
Ships sunk by US aircraft
Attack on Pearl Harbor
Shipwrecks of the Philippines